Euphorbia grandidens, commonly known as valleybush euphorbia or large-toothed euphorbia, is a species of plant in the family Euphorbiaceae native to southern Africa.

References 

grandidens
grandidens